Postel Sport is a football club in Benin, playing in the town of Porto-Novo. They play in the Beninese Second division.

In 1991 the team won the Benin Premier League.

Stadium
Currently the team plays at the 35000 capacity Stade Charles de Gaulle.

Performance in CAF competitions
CAF Champions League: 1 appearance
1992 African Cup of Champions Clubs – First Round

References

External links

Football clubs in Benin